John O'Sullivan (11 May 1918 – 17 July 1991) was a New Zealand cricketer. He played three first-class matches for Otago between 1946 and 1948.

See also
 List of Otago representative cricketers

References

External links
 

1918 births
1991 deaths
New Zealand cricketers
Otago cricketers
Cricketers from Dunedin